A diastema is a gap between two adjacent teeth.

Diastema may refer to:
Diastema (moth), a genus of moths in the family Noctuidae
Diastema (plant), a flowering plant in the family Gesneriaceae